Anatoly Stepanovich Badrankov (2 April 1941 – 30 May 1998) was a Kazakhstani long-distance runner. He competed in the men's 10,000 metres at the 1972 Summer Olympics, representing the Soviet Union.

References

1941 births
1998 deaths
Athletes (track and field) at the 1972 Summer Olympics
Kazakhstani male long-distance runners
Soviet male long-distance runners
Olympic athletes of the Soviet Union
Place of birth missing